June Lake is a subalpine lake within the Inyo National Forest, in Mono County, eastern California.

Geography
It is one of the four lakes (June Lake, Gull Lake, Silver Lake & Grant Lake) inside the June Lake Loop.

Activities
Fishing is considered one of the favorite summer sports. A small population of Lahontan cutthroat trout can be found in June Lake. In the 1960s rainbow trout were plentiful.  There are two marinas at June Lake: June Lake Marina and Big Rock Resort.

See also

List of lakes in California

References

Lakes of Mono County, California
Lakes of the Sierra Nevada (United States)
Inyo National Forest
Lakes of California
Lakes of Northern California